Deerskin is a 2019 French black comedy film written and directed by Quentin Dupieux. It stars Jean Dujardin and Adèle Haenel. In the film, Georges (Dujardin) becomes obssessive after purchasing a fringed deerskin jacket.

It had its world premiere at the Cannes Film Festival in the Directors' Fortnight section on 15 May 2019. It was released in France on 19 June 2019 by Diaphana Distribution.

Plot
Georges, 44, buys a vintage fringed deerskin motorcycle jacket for €7,500 from an older man who lives in the countryside. The seller also gives him a digital camcorder, for which he has no use.

After buying the jacket, Georges checks into a small hotel in a nearby mountainside village. Having spent all his money on the jacket, he leaves his wedding ring as collateral with the receptionist. He meets a local bartender, a young woman named Denise, and says he is a filmmaker in town on a shoot. Denise is an amateur editor and takes interest.

Georges discovers that his estranged wife has frozen his bank account. He begins hearing his jacket speak to him, telling him it dreams of being the only jacket in the world. Georges convinces Denise to begin financing his film, which she will edit. He uses the money to pay a series of townspeople to appear on film giving up their jackets, which he then steals. A mute boy watches him in several instances, and Georges eventually throws a brick at him.

Georges slowly assembles a full deerskin outfit as he continues filming the scenes. When one subject refuses to hand over his jacket in the cold, Georges kills him. Shortly after, Georges breaks a blade off his hotel room ceiling fan, sharpens it into a weapon, and goes on a killing spree, all of which he films. He buries the resulting jackets in a hole outside town.

Denise, excited at the new footage, offers to produce the film and use part of her inheritance to finish it. She also reveals she's known Georges was a fraud since they met. After buying him a pair of deerskin gloves, she films him preening in his full outfit on a roadside hill. From the other side of the hill, the mute boy's father suddenly shoots Georges in the head with a hunting rifle. Denise continues filming as she takes the jacket off George's corpse and dons it.

In a mid-credits scene, Georges films himself with his jacket as he approaches a herd of deer.

Cast

Jean Dujardin as Georges
Adèle Haenel as Denise
Albert Delpy as Monsieur B.
Pierre Gommé as Nicolas
Marie Bunel as Kylie
Coralie Russier as Vic
Laurent Nicolas as Norbert
Youssef Hajdi as Olaf
Julia Faure as Jeanne
Thomas Blanchard as Michael
Tom Hudson as Yann
Stéphane Jobert as Adrien
Franck Lebreton as David
Panayotis Pascot as Johnny
Maryne Cayon as Zita

Production
In March 2018, it was announced Jean Dujardin had joined the cast of the film, with Quentin Dupieux directing from a screenplay he wrote. Shooting started in the same month in Sarrance in the Pyrénées Atlantiques region of France. It was also shot in the Aspe Valley and surrounding regions.

Release
It had its world premiere at the Cannes Film Festival on 15 May 2019 in the Directors Fortnight section. It was released in France on 19 June 2019 by Diaphana Distribution. It went onto screen at the Toronto International Film Festival on 12 September 2019. Prior to, Greenwich Entertainment and Picturehouse Entertainment acquired U.S. and UK distribution rights to the film. It also screened at AFI Fest on 16 November 2019.

It was scheduled to be released in the United States on 20 March 2020. However, it was pulled from the schedule due to the COVID-19 pandemic. It is scheduled to be released in the United Kingdom on 16 July 2021.

Deerskin was released in France on Blu-ray, DVD, and VOD on 5 November 2019.

Critical reception
The website's critical consensus reads, "Led by a daring performance from Jean Dujardin, Deerskin finds writer-director Quentin Dupieux working in a more accessible -- yet still distinctive -- vein." On Metacritic, the film holds a rating of 65 out of 100, based on 18 critics, indicating "generally favorable reviews".

References

External links

2019 comedy films
2019 comedy horror films
2010s crime comedy films
2010s French-language films
French comedy horror films
French crime comedy films
Films directed by Quentin Dupieux
Films shot in France
2010s French films